The Dynamic Graphics Project (commonly referred to as dgp) is an interdisciplinary research laboratory at the University of Toronto devoted to projects involving Computer Graphics, Computer Vision, Human Computer Interaction, and Visualization. The lab began as the computer graphics research group of Computer Science Professor  in 1967. Mezei invited Bill Buxton, a  pioneer of human–computer interaction to join. In 1972, Ronald Baecker, another HCI pioneer joined dgp, establishing dgp as the first Canadian university group focused on computer graphics and human-computer interaction. According to csrankings.org, for the combined subfields of computer graphics, HCI, and visualization the dgp is the number one research institution in the world.

Since then, dgp has hosted many well known faculty and students in computer graphics, computer vision and HCI (e.g., Alain Fournier, Bill Reeves,  Jos Stam, Demetri Terzopoulos, Marilyn Tremaine). dgp also occasionally hosts artists in residence (e.g., Oscar-winner Chris Landreth). Many past and current researchers at Autodesk (and before that Alias Wavefront) graduated after working at dgp. dgp is located in the St. George Campus of University of Toronto in the Bahen Centre for Information Technology. dgp researchers regularly publish at ACM SIGGRAPH, ACM SIGCHI and ICCV.

dgp hosts the Toronto User Experience (TUX) Speaker Series and the Sanders Series Lectures.

Notable alumni
 Bill Buxton (MS 1978)
 James McCrae (PhD 2013)
 Dimitris Metaxas (PhD 1992)
 Bill Reeves (MS 1976, Ph.D. 1980)
 Jos Stam (MS 1991, Ph.D. 1995)

References

Computer graphics
Computer vision
Human–computer interaction
University of Toronto